The South Central Historic District in Alexander City, Alabama is a historic district that was listed on the National Register of Historic Places in 2005.

The district is roughly bounded by Broad St., Tallpoosa St., Cherokee Rd., Bishop St., Franklin St., and Willow St.

Besides the Jackson House on Cherokee Road, which was built in the 1860s, all contributing resources in the district were built during 1890 to 1950, and the Jackson House was itself remodelled extensively around 1910.

Architectural styles represented include Queen Anne and Greek Revival. It includes two "well-articulated" Queen Anne houses, and 12 shotgun houses.

The Benjamin Russell School, built in 1950 with a 1980 three-story front addition, and 24 other buildings in the district were deemed non-contributing.

References

External links

Historic districts on the National Register of Historic Places in Alabama
National Register of Historic Places in Tallapoosa County, Alabama
Queen Anne architecture in Alabama
Greek Revival architecture in Alabama